A Political Party is a 1934 British comedy film directed by Norman Lee and starring Leslie Fuller, John Mills, Enid Stamp-Taylor and Viola Lyel. The screenplay concerns the son of a chimney sweep running for parliament in a by-election. Part of a series of Leslie Fuller vehicles, it was produced by British International Pictures at the company's Elstree Studios.

Premise
The son of a chimney sweep running for parliament in a by-election, unwittingly helps his father's opponent.

Cast
 John Mills as Tony Smithers
 Enid Stamp-Taylor as Elvira Whitman
 H. F. Maltby as Sir James Barrington-Oakes
 Viola Lyel as Mary Smithers
 Leslie Fuller as Bill Smithers
 Hal Gordon as Alf Jenks
 Marian Dawson as Sarah Jeaks
 Charles K. Gerrard as Mr. Whitman
 Daphne Courtney as Kathleen Jenks
 Moore Marriott as Jim Turner

References

Bibliography
 Low, Rachael. Filmmaking in 1930s Britain. George Allen & Unwin, 1985.
 Wood, Linda. British Films, 1927-1939. British Film Institute, 1986.

External links
 

1934 films
1934 comedy films
British political comedy films
Films shot at British International Pictures Studios
Films directed by Norman Lee
1930s political comedy films
British black-and-white films
1930s English-language films
1930s British films